Humble Duty (1967–1975) was an Irish-bred, British-trained Thoroughbred racehorse. In a racing career lasting from May 1969 until September 1970, the filly ran eleven times and won eight races. As a two-year-old she was rated the best of her age and sex in Britain after winning the Lowther Stakes at York and the Cheveley Park Stakes at Newmarket. In the following season she won five races, all over one mile, including the 1000 Guineas at Newmarket, the Coronation Stakes at Royal Ascot and the Sussex Stakes at Goodwood. She was retired to stud at the end of that season, but had little chance to make an impact as a broodmare, dying in 1975 at the age of eight.

Background
Humble Duty was a grey filly bred at the Owenstown Stud at Maynooth in County Kildare, Ireland by Frank Tuthill. Her sire Sovereign Path, from whom she inherited her colour, was a top class miler who won the Lockinge Stakes and the Queen Elizabeth II Stakes. Humble Duty's dam, Flattering was placed in the Cheveley Park Stakes and was out of Flatter, a moderate race mare but a half-sister to The Derby runner-up Gay Time.

As a yearling, Humble Duty was sent to the Newmarket sales where she was bought for 17,000 guineas by the British Bloodstock Agency, acting on behalf of Jean, Lady Ashcombe, the widow of Roland Cubitt, 3rd Baron Ashcombe. Humble Duty was sent into training with Peter Walwyn at his Seven Barrows stable at Lambourn.

Racing career

1969: two-year-old season
Humble Duty's first appearance on a racecourse came in May 1969 when she won the Ann Boleyn Stakes over five furlongs at Sandown Park. Although the winning margin was only a length and the opposition moderate, Humble Duty was immediately moved up in class to contest the Queen Mary Stakes at Royal Ascot. She led for most of the race before being overtaken a furlong from the finish and took third place behind Farfalla. After a break of two months, during which she was affected by a cough, she returned in the Lowther Stakes at York in August in which she was matched against Mange Tout, a filly who had won the Prix d'Arenberg and the Molecomb Stakes. Humble Duty won by three quarters of a length from Pisces, with Mange Tout in third. Her final appearance of the year came in the Cheveley Park Stakes at Newmarket in October. Humble Duty led from the start and won by two and a half lengths from Farfalla and Black Satin.

In the Free Handicap, a ranking of the best two-year-olds to have run in Britain in 1969, Humble Duty was the top-rated filly, seven pounds below the leading colt Nijinsky. She was also made the ante-post favourite for the following year's 1000 Guineas.

1970: three-year-old season
On her first appearance of 1970, Humble Duty ran at Newbury in the Fred Darling Stakes, a trial race for the 1000 Guineas. She appeared less than fully fit and was given a very gentle race by her jockey Lester Piggott in finishing second to Highest Hopes. In the 1000 Guineas two weeks later, Humble Duty started 3/1 joint-favourite in a field of twelve runners. Ridden by Piggott Humble Duty took the lead inside the final quarter mile and drew well clear of her opponents. She won very easily by seven lengths from Gleam, with Black Satin two lengths further back in third and Highest Hopes unplaced. The winning margin was the widest in the race in the 20th century.

Humble Duty was sent to Epsom in June, but bypassed the one and a half mile Oaks, running instead in the Ebbisham Stakes over eight and a half furlongs and winning by four lengths. At Royal Ascot in June, Humble Duty started at odds of 1/6 in the Coronation Stakes and won very easily from Black Satin, who had won the Irish 1000 Guineas since her defeat at Newmarket. Having beaten the best of her own age and sex, the filly was then tried against colts and older horses in the Sussex Stakes at Goodwood in July. Ridden by Duncan Keith, Humble Duty won decisively by three-quarters of a length from Gold Rod, Joshua and Welsh Pageant. In August, Humble Duty added another major victory over Goodwood's mile course when she won the Wills Mile by a length from Prince de Galles (Cambridgeshire Handicap) and Yellow God (runner-up to Nijinsky in the 2000 Guineas).

In her final race, Humble Duty failed to reproduce her best form, finishing fourth behind Welsh Pageant, Gold Rod and Prince de Galles in the Queen Elizabeth II Stakes at Ascot in September.

Retirement
Humble Duty's breeding career was brief and disappointing. She produced two known foals, neither of whom proved to be of any use as racehorses. In 1974 she miscarried a foal sired by Mill Reef. Humble Duty died in 1975 at the age of eight.

Assessment and honours
In their book, A Century of Champions, based on the Timeform rating system, John Randall and Tony Morris rated Humble Duty a "superior" winner of the 1000 Guineas and the forty-seventh best filly trained in Britain or Ireland in the 20th century.

Humble Duty was given a rating of 127 by Timeform in 1970.

Pedigree

References

External links
Still from television coverage of the 1000 Guineas
Photograph of Humble Duty returning to the winner's circle at Newmarket
Press photograph of Humble Duty winning the Sussex Stakes

1967 racehorse births
1975 racehorse deaths
Racehorses bred in Ireland
Racehorses trained in the United Kingdom
Thoroughbred family 21-a
1000 Guineas winners